Tender Togetherness is a studio album by tenor saxophonist Stanley Turrentine, released in April 1981 on Elektra Records. The album reached No. 13 on the Billboard Jazz Albums chart.

Track listing

Personnel

Musicians
Philip Bailey – Percussion, vocals, background vocals
Roland Bautista - Guitar, electric guitar
Leon "Ndugu" Chancler - Drums
Paulinho Da Costa – Percussion
Lynn Davis - Vocals
Rahmlee Michael Davis – Trumpet, flugelhorn
Eduardo del Barrio - Piano, electric piano, Fender Rhodes
David Duke – French horn
Steven Dunn – Percussion, drums, Moog bass
Nathan East - Bass guitar, electric guitar
Mike Harris - Trumpet, flugelhorn
Jerry Hey – Trumpet, flugelhorn
Marlena Jeter - Vocals
Jeff Johnson – Synthesizer
Ralph Johnson - Percussion
Gwen Matthews - Vocals
Byron Miller - Bass guitar
Denzil Miller - Piano, electric piano, clavinet, Fender Rhodes
Sidney Muldrow – French horn
Don Myrick - Alto saxophone
Tom Pigott Smith - Synthesizer
Dianne Reeves - Vocals
Bill Reichenbach Jr. - Bass trombone
Louis Satterfield - Trombone
Stanley Turrentine - Tenor saxophone
Fred White - Percussion, drums
Andrew Woolfolk - Tenor saxophone

Production
Philip Bailey – Arranger
Roland Bautista - Arranger
George del Barrio – Conductor, string arrangements
Leon "Ndugu" Chancler - Arranger, drums
Lynn Davis - Vocal arrangement
Rahmlee Michael Davis – Horn arrangements
Eduardo del Barrio - Arranger
Larry Dunn - Arranger, producer, vocal arrangement
Steven Dunn – Arranger
Mike Harris - Horn arrangements
Denzil Miller - Arranger, vocal arrangement
Don Myrick - Horn arrangements
Louis Satterfield - Horn arrangements

Charts

References

1981 albums
Stanley Turrentine albums
Elektra Records albums